StreetLITES Africa was a charity working with schools in Ghana, Africa to help educate and care for street children.

The "LITES" is an acronym of: Learning, Information, Technology, Empowerment and Support to street children in Africa and India. It is now closed and has been wound up.

Established goals 

The charity described their work as empowering agencies to provide computer resources alongside their existing outreach programs. They collected redundant IT hardware and other educational goods with the aim to place them with agencies who are working to help abolish poverty.

Funding and partners 

Funding was provided mainly by donations from the public, the charity also worked with partners in the UK and Ghana, for example Refurbit Hull, in the UK and the Apostolic Church in Ghana. Central to the project was the Microsoft "Fresh start initiative" which provided the Microsoft Windows licences for the computers.

History 

The charity was started in 2004 after a visit to Ghana by a group, four of that group now form the trustees of the charity.
On their return they decided they could do something to help the needy in Ghana, they observed the abundance of computers and software discarded in the west, and the lack of this provision in Ghana. They contacted local companies and discovered that it was viable to ship computers to Ghana, as a charity.

Since the early days many visits have been made to and from Ghana and the UK, the most significant as a charity occurred at Easter 2006, when a delegation visited the various agencies they had partnered with provided with computers.

Future projects 

The charity had a direct sponsorship project where members of the public sponsored children associated with the agencies the charity is partnered with.

See also 

Apostolic Church
Ghana

References

External links
StreetLITES.org
Refurbit Hull

Educational charities based in the United Kingdom
Information technology charities
Foreign charities operating in Ghana